Donald K. Milton is a professor of environmental health at the University of Maryland School of Public Health. He also holds a secondary appointment in the Department of Medicine at the University of Maryland School of Medicine. He is known for his research in the field of aerobiology and his pioneering work on the airborne transmission of respiratory viruses such as SARS-CoV-2.

References

External links
Faculty page

Living people
University of Maryland, College Park faculty
Harvard School of Public Health alumni
Johns Hopkins School of Medicine alumni
21st-century American physicians
20th-century American physicians
Public health researchers
Year of birth missing (living people)
COVID-19 researchers